Four referendums were held in San Marino on 16 March 2008. Voters were asked questions on the voting system, raising salaries in line with inflation, projects, and the abolition of temporary employment contracts. As voter turnout was just 35.36%, all four referendums failed to pass the 32% quorum of registered voters required.

Results

Voting system
Voters were asked whether they wanted to only allow voters a single preference on their ballots.

Wages rising in line with inflation
Voters were asked whether they wished for salaries of employees to be revalued on 1 January each year in line with the rate of inflation recorded by the Centro di Elaborazione Dati e Statistica dello Stato.

Projects
Voters were asked whether they wished to delete Article 18 of the September 2005 law on promoting, supporting and developing employment training, which related to projects.

Temporary contracts
Voters were asked whether they wished to delete Article 17 of the September 2005 law on promoting, supporting and developing employment training, which related to temporary contracts.

References

Referendums in San Marino
2008 in San Marino
2008 referendums
March 2008 events in Europe